Claudio Norberto Caimi (born on 7 August 1967), is an Argentinian football coach and former player who most recently coached the St. Kitts and Nevis national team.

References

1967 births
Living people
Argentine footballers
Footballers from Buenos Aires
Association football forwards
Association football midfielders
CA Excursionistas players
K.S.V. Roeselare players
R.E. Mouscron players
Hapoel Beit She'an F.C. players
Maccabi Herzliya F.C. players
Argentine expatriate footballers
Argentine expatriate sportspeople in Belgium
Expatriate footballers in Belgium
Argentine expatriate sportspeople in Israel
Expatriate footballers in Israel
Argentine football managers
Saint Kitts and Nevis national football team managers